Notti may refer to:
 a type of tteok in Korean cuisine
 a surname; notable people with the name include:
 Emil Notti (born 1933), American engineer, activist and politician
 Emilio Notti (1891–1982), Italian painter

See also

Netti (disambiguation)